Reporters is a weekly analytical programme shown on BBC News, during BBC Breakfast on BBC One and BBC World News.

The programme features a presenter linking a number of BBC news reports from the past week or highlighting a topic or a series of reports and in some cases conducting interviews with correspondents present at the time the events took place. It was also shown on the BBC News Channel in the UK, but since mid-2017, this is no longer broadcast.

Normally, the Thursday presenter of World News Today presents the show. Its sister show is UK Reporters which shows viewers internationally the best reports from across the United Kingdom.

Presenters

Former presenters
 Carrie Gracie – Deputy presenter 2013-2014
 Zeinab Badawi – Main presenter 20??-2014

Special editions

Lyse Doucet presented a special edition in December 2013 marking three years since the start of the Arab uprisings and reports assessing the impact of the protests across the region. Another edition was presented by Komla Dumor looking back at the life of Nelson Mandela. In late December a two part episode airs looking back at the best reports from the last twelve months episode split January – June and July – December. Clive Myrie presented an edition in April 2015 looking at Europes Migration crisis.

External links
Reporters BBC News
 BBC Online reporters blog

BBC television news shows
BBC World News shows